Lyle Franklin Lane (September 19, 1926 – December 26, 2013) was a United States diplomat.

Among his overseas posts Ambassador Lane served as the first Chief of Mission of the United States Interests Section in Havana (heading the return of U.S. diplomats to Cuba in 1977),  United States Ambassador to Uruguay, and United States Ambassador to Paraguay.

Biography

A career diplomat, Lyle Lane joined the United States Foreign Service in 1952. His overseas postings include:
  United States Ambassador to Paraguay (1980–82)
  United States Ambassador to Uruguay (1979–80)
  Head of Mission to United States Interests Section in Havana (1977–79)
  United States Deputy Chief of Mission to Peru (1976–77)
  United States Deputy Chief of Mission / Chargé d'affaires to Costa Rica (1972–76)
  Regional Office of Central American Projects (ROCAP) Guatemala (1966–68)
  United States Principal Officer of Consulate, Cebu, Philippines (1962–66)
  United States Diplomatic Political Officer and Aid to Ambassador John Davis Lodge, Madrid, Spain (1955–59)
  United States Consul, Guayaquil, Ecuador (1953–55)

Ambassador Lane also served as International Affairs Adviser to the Commander-in-Chief of U.S. Atlantic Command (CINCLANT) and NATO's Supreme Allied Commander Atlantic (SACLANT).

Ambassador Lane received degrees from University of Washington (B.S. 1950) and George Washington University (M.S. 1969).  At U.W. he was a member of the Chi Phi Fraternity.

Ambassador Lane was married to Jaclyn Fuller.

Havana
The US broke diplomatic relations with Cuba on January 3, 1961, formally due to a disagreement about staffing levels at the respective Embassies. U.S. President Dwight D. Eisenhower stated at the time, "There is a limit to what the United States in self-respect can endure. That limit has now been reached". Protective powers were appointed to represent each country in the capital of the other. The US was represented by Switzerland in Havana, and the Cubans by Czechoslovakia in Washington. These offices, sections of the respective embassies, were staffed by Swiss and Czechoslovak diplomats.

US and Cuban Interests Sections staffed by actual US and Cuban diplomats were mutually agreed upon in 1977 after the Carter Administration took office and decided to seek normalization of relations with Cuba. US officials replaced the Swiss in the US Interests Section in Havana on September 1, 1977. Both under the Swiss and later with US staff, the Section has occupied the former United States Embassy building on Havana's Malecon which was designed by Harrison & Abramovitz architects and originally entered into service in 1953. When relations were broken in 1961, the building was occupied, and its contents safeguarded, by the Swiss Embassy personnel who handled US Interests in Cuba on behalf of the US Government as the protecting power until the arrival of the US staff in 1977.

The Swiss staff included some of the Foreign Service national employees (Cuban citizens) who were working at the US Embassy when relations were broken. Sixteen years later, when the US Government resumed its presence, many of them remained and resumed their direct employment. Most of the local hires employed by the Swiss also continued their employment. New hires were obtained through CUBALSE, the Cuban Government enterprise that serviced diplomatic missions.

The initial American staffing of the Section consisted of ten State Department Officials and a plain clothes US Marine guard detachment. By mutual agreement, the Cubans had an equal  number of staff in Washington. Lyle Franklin Lane was the first Chief of the Interests Section in Havana.

References

External links

 United States Department of State: Chiefs of Mission by Country, 1778-2005
 Lyle Franklin Lane at The Political Graveyard
 Lyle Lane discusses mutual exchange program between United States and Cuba
 Lyle Franklin Lane at Namebase.org 
 Lyle Franklin Lane at The American Presidency Project (United States Ambassador to Uruguay Nomination)
 Lyle Franklin Lane at The American Presidency Project (United States Ambassador to Paraguay Nomination)
 Lyle Franklin Lane in the Philippine Star

Citations
 Cuba and the United States: A Chronological History By Jane Franklin
 The Destruction of a Nation: United States' Policy Towards Angola Since 1945 By George Wright
 Imperial State and Revolution: The United States and Cuba, 1952-1986 By Morris H. Morley
 Reversing Relations with Former Adversaries: U.S. Foreign Policy After the Cold War By C. Richard Nelson, Kenneth Weisbrode
 United Nations Treaty Collention
  United Nations Treaty Collention

Ambassadors of the United States to Paraguay
Ambassadors of the United States to Uruguay
1926 births
People from Tacoma, Washington
University of Washington alumni
Elliott School of International Affairs alumni
George Washington University alumni
2013 deaths
United States Foreign Service personnel